Tyers River was a railway station on the Walhalla narrow gauge line in Gippsland, Victoria, Australia. The station was closed in 1916 due to lack of patronage.  The station was located just 885m from Gould Station.

References

Disused railway stations in Victoria (Australia)
Transport in Gippsland (region)
Shire of Baw Baw
Walhalla railway line